Barry Emmanuel Tuckwell,  (5 March 1931 – 16 January 2020) was an Australian French horn player who spent most of his professional life in the UK and the United States. He is generally considered to have been one of the world's leading horn players.

Early life and education 
Barry Tuckwell was born on 5 March 1931 in Melbourne, son of Charles Tuckwell, an organist, and his wife Elizabeth. 5 March is known by many as the Horn Duumvirate Date, as it was the birth date of both Tuckwell and Philip Farkas, both highly regarded horn players. He had an older sister, Patricia, a violinist and fashion model widely known as Bambi. She married the photographer Athol Shmith and later George Lascelles, 7th Earl of Harewood, a first cousin of Queen Elizabeth II.

After studying the piano, organ and violin as a chorister at St Andrew's Cathedral, Sydney, Tuckwell was introduced to the French horn at age 13 and was playing professionally within six months. He studied at the Sydney Conservatorium of Music under Alan Mann, one of Australia's most influential brass players. Tuckwell has said, "The horn chose me. Right from the beginning, it was something I knew I could do."

Tuckwell related an anecdote regarding his choice of instrument: sitting in a cafe one day with his sister Patricia, Charles Mackerras and a horn player from the local symphony, Patricia speculated on what Tuckwell's future in music might be. The horn player suggested, "Why not try the horn?" Tuckwell did so and within two years was playing in the Sydney Symphony Orchestra. With characteristic humour, when recounting this at the British Horn Society's festival in 2005, he turned to the audience and said, "One note at a time, piece of cake!" The horn is often considered to be one of the most difficult orchestral instruments to master.

Performing career

Orchestral

At 15, Tuckwell was appointed by Joseph Post as third horn with the Melbourne Symphony Orchestra. A year later, he joined the Sydney Symphony Orchestra under Eugene Goossens, where he remained for three and a half years before leaving for England. His first appointment in 1951 was with the Hallé Orchestra under Sir John Barbirolli. After two years, he went to the Scottish National Orchestra under Karl Rankl and a year later to the Bournemouth Symphony Orchestra under Charles Groves. In 1955, he was appointed first horn with the London Symphony Orchestra.

During his 13 years with the LSO, a co-operative orchestra run by the players, he was elected to the board of directors and was chairman of the board for six years. The chief conductors during this time were Josef Krips, Pierre Monteux, István Kertész and André Previn.

Soloist

He resigned from the orchestra in 1968 to pursue a career as a soloist and conductor. For the next thirty years, he carved out a career exclusively as soloist – one of the few horn virtuosos to have done so , rather than combining occasional concert performances with an orchestral position or a teaching post. At the age of 65, he decided to retire. His last concert was with the Baltimore Symphony Orchestra in 1997, at the age of 65.

He was one of the most recorded horn soloists, having made over 50 recordings. He has received three Grammy Award nominations.

Chamber music

In 1962 he formed a trio with Brenton Langbein (violin) and Maureen Jones (piano) for a performance of the Horn Trio by Don Banks, which was commissioned by the Edinburgh Festival. The trio played together for many years, touring in Europe, Asia and Australia until the death of Brenton Langbein. They recorded the Banks Trio, the Brahms Trio, and Quatre Petites Pièces by Charles Koechlin for Tudor records.

He formed a wind quintet in 1968, which also toured internationally.

Conducting

Tuckwell was also well known as a conductor, appearing with leading orchestras in Europe and the United States. For four seasons he was Chief Conductor of the Tasmanian Symphony Orchestra and in 1982 founded the Maryland Symphony Orchestra. He enjoyed a long association with the Northern Sinfonia and was appointed their Guest Conductor following an acclaimed fourteen-concert tour of North America.

Recordings as a conductor include three CDs with the London Symphony Orchestra of music by Dvořák, Elgar and Wagner. More recently, he conducted the West Australian Symphony Orchestra in an ABC Classics recording of the Mozart horn concertos with soloist Lin Jiang and The Queensland Orchestra for Melba Recordings of horn concertos with Ben Jacks.

Works written for Tuckwell 

Many composers wrote works for Tuckwell. Oliver Knussen, Don Banks, Gunther Schuller, Robin Holloway and Thea Musgrave wrote concertos; Richard Rodney Bennett wrote "Acteon" for horn and large orchestra at Tuckwell's request. Barry Tuckwell premiered Tony Randall's Prelude for solo horn.

Writings 

Barry Tuckwell wrote three important books on the horn and horn playing. For the Yehudi Menuhin Music Guides, he wrote the book on the horn. His definitive manual Playing the Horn was published by Oxford University Press (now out of print) as was Fifty First Exercises.

Teaching

Tuckwell was known for his master classes.  He was Artist-in-Residence at Dartmouth College and Pomona College in the United States, and was Professor of Horn at the Royal Academy of Music in London from 1963 until 1974. He served as Distinguished Visiting Faculty at the Peabody Conservatory in Baltimore in the 1980s and 1990s. He held the position of Professorial Fellow at the University of Melbourne and for several years hosted the annual Barry Tuckwell Institute at Colorado Mesa University in Grand Junction, Colorado.

Death
Tuckwell died in Melbourne, aged 88, on 16 January 2020 of complications from heart disease.

Awards and honours
Tuckwell was made an Officer of the Order of the British Empire in 1965 and a Companion of the Order of Australia in 1992.

Among the many other awards he has received are an Honorary Doctor of Music from the University of Sydney, Fellow of the Royal College of Music, Fellow of the Royal Society of Arts, the George Peabody Medal for Outstanding Contributions to Music in America, the Andrew White Medal from Loyola College and the Harriet Cohen Memorial Award.

He was also an honorary member of both the Royal Academy of Music and the Guildhall School of Music and Drama in London.

He was the first president of the International Horn Society and was honorary president of the British Horn Society and the patron of the Melbourne International Festival of Brass.

He was a National Patron of Delta Omicron, an international professional music fraternity.

Bernard Heinze Memorial Award
The Sir Bernard Heinze Memorial Award is given to a person who has made an outstanding contribution to music in Australia.

! 
|-
| 2007 || Barry Tuckwell || Sir Bernard Heinze Memorial Award ||  || 
|-

Helpmann Awards
The Helpmann Awards is an awards show, celebrating live entertainment and performing arts in Australia, presented by industry group Live Performance Australia (LPA) since 2001. In 2007, Tuckwell received the JC Williamson Award, the LPA's highest honour, for their life's work in live performance.

|-
| 2007 || Himself || JC Williamson Award || 
|-

Notes

References

External links
 https://web.archive.org/web/20090421060055/http://www.barrytuckwellinstitute.com/

1931 births
2020 deaths
Australian Officers of the Order of the British Empire
Companions of the Order of Australia
Musicians from Melbourne
Australian classical horn players
Sydney Conservatorium of Music alumni
Helpmann Award winners
Honorary Members of the Royal Academy of Music
Peabody Institute faculty
London Symphony Orchestra players
Pomona College faculty